Christine Joan Taylor Stiller (born July 30, 1971) is an American actress. She is best known for playing Marcia Brady in The Brady Bunch Movie and A Very Brady Sequel, as well as roles in films including The Craft, The Wedding Singer, Zoolander, and Dodgeball: A True Underdog Story as well as for her television roles in Hey Dude, Arrested Development, and Search Party.

Early life
Taylor was born on July 30, 1971 in Allentown, Pennsylvania to Joan, a homemaker, and Albert "Skip" Taylor III who owns a security company. She grew up in neighboring Wescosville, Pennsylvania. She has a younger brother, Brian.

Taylor was raised Roman Catholic and attended St. Thomas More School and Allentown Central Catholic High School.

Career
Taylor began her acting career in 1989 on the Nickelodeon children's television series Hey Dude where she played the lifeguard Melody Hanson. She continued in that role through 1991 while making various guest appearances on other programs and films. In 1995, Taylor was cast as Marcia Brady in The Brady Bunch Movie and later in A Very Brady Sequel. Following The Brady Bunch Movie, Taylor made several comedic guest appearances on the TV series Ellen, landing the lead role in the television series Party Girl, based on the 1995 film of the same name, and more guest appearances on Seinfeld and Friends. She played the racist school bully Laura Lizzie in the 1996 horror film The Craft, and also played Drew Barrymore's cousin, Holly Sullivan, in the 1998 comedy The Wedding Singer. In 2001, she starred alongside her husband Ben Stiller in Zoolander.

She guest starred on television in 2005, in two episodes of Arrested Development as "Sally Sitwell", and in 2006 in an episode of NBC's My Name Is Earl. In July 2006, Taylor's husband Ben Stiller announced plans to direct a CBS sitcom starring Taylor, but the series never aired. She has appeared with Mandy Moore in both Dedication and License to Wed. In 2010, Taylor guest starred in Hannah Montana Forever. In 2010, she also starred in the Hallmark Channel Christmas movie Farewell Mr. Kringle. In 2013, Taylor reprised her role as Sally Sitwell in two episodes of the revived Arrested Development. She also guest starred on Elementary in 2017, playing villainess Gail Lundquist. 

Beginning in 2016, Taylor has had a recurring role as Gail on Search Party. In 2021, Taylor joined the cast of High Desert, an Apple TV+ series.

Personal life
Taylor dated actor Neil Patrick Harris from 1997 to 1998. 

Taylor married actor Ben Stiller, whom she first met in 1999 while they were both filming Heat Vision and Jack. Taylor and Stiller appeared together in the films Zoolander, Dodgeball: A True Underdog Story, Tropic Thunder, and Zoolander 2 as well as in the TV series Arrested Development and Curb Your Enthusiasm. They live in Westchester County, New York and have a daughter and a son. Both adopted a vegetarian diet for health reasons. After 17 years of marriage Taylor and Stiller separated in 2017. The couple later reconciled after living together during the COVID-19 pandemic lockdown.

Filmography

Film

Television

References

External links

1971 births
Living people
20th-century American actresses
21st-century American actresses
Actresses from Allentown, Pennsylvania
Allentown Central Catholic High School alumni
American film actresses
American Roman Catholics
American television actresses
American voice actresses